Hotel Paradise may refer to:

Film and TV
Hotel Paradis, 1931 Danish film
 Hotel Paradise (1937 film), a Swedish comedy film
Hotel Paradiso (film), 1966 film
Hotel Paradise (1980 film), (Italian: Orinoco - Prigioniere del sesso) film with Ajita Wilson
Hotel Paradise (1995 film), 29 min film by Nicholas Roeg
Paradise Hotel, US reality show
Hotel Paradise, Czech version of reality show on Prima televize
Hotel Paradise, Greek play with Giannis Bezos
Paradise Hotel (film), a 2010 Bulgarian documentary

Other
Hotel Paradise (album), Diva Gray
Hotel Paradise, novel by Carol Drinkwater

See also
 Paradise Hotel (disambiguation)